Kardec is a 2019 Brazilian drama film directed by Wagner de Assis and written by L.G. Bayão and Wagner de Assis.

Plot
Hippolyte Léon Denizard Rivail, a French educator who, when studying the phenomenon of “Spinning tables”, discovers that there is the possibility of communicating with the spirits. As an encoder of the Spiritism doctrine, Professor Rivail assumes the pseudonym of Allan Kardec and elaborates, under the guidance of the spirits, the five main books that guide Spiritist studies.

Cast 
 Christian Baltauss
 Letícia Braga as Julie
 Sandra Corveloni as Amélie
 Louise D'Tuani as Ermance Dufaux
 Genésio de Barros as Padre Boutin
 Charles Fricks as Charles Baudin
 Julia Konrad as Ruth-Celine
 Leonardo Medeiros as Rivail / Allan Kardec
 Henrique Neves as Cáligrafo
 Guilherme Piva as Didier
 Júlia Svacinna as Caroline
 Guida Vianna as Madame Plainemaison
 Dalton Vigh as Sr. Dufaux

Production

Filming
The film had a week of filming in Paris and four weeks on locations in Rio de Janeiro. All the scenes in the French capital had digital intervention for the erasure of modern buildings.

References

External links
 

2019 biographical drama films
2019 drama films
2019 films
Brazilian biographical drama films
Films about Spiritism
Films based on biographies
Films set in Paris
Films set in the 18th century
2010s Portuguese-language films